Alex Gansa is a screenwriter and producer best known as the creator, executive producer and showrunner of the Showtime series Homeland, based on the original Israeli series Prisoners of War created by Gideon Raff.

He produced and wrote a number of scripts for the Beauty and the Beast television series. Previously he worked as a writer and supervising producer on The X-Files in its first two seasons, and on Dawson's Creek in its third season. After that he was involved with the short-lived series Wolf Lake, a series focusing on a group of werewolves in North West America, as an executive producer and a writer. Gansa was also involved in the TV series Numb3rs and HBO's Entourage.

More recently he joined the writing crew of 24 for its seventh season. Gansa is also one of the co-creators and showrunner of Homeland, a 2011 series for Showtime.

In 2012, he was nominated and won a Primetime Emmy Award for Outstanding Writing for a Drama Series for writing the "Pilot" of Homeland, also winning an Emmy for Best Drama Series.

References

External links

Living people
American male screenwriters
American television producers
American soap opera writers
Homeland (TV series)
Primetime Emmy Award winners
Year of birth missing (living people)
Showrunners
American male television writers
Groton School alumni